Welland Ward, representing the north eastern part of Kettering Borough, is a 1-member ward within Kettering Borough Council. The ward was last fought at Borough Council level in the 2015 local council elections, in which the seat was won by the Conservatives.

The current councillor is Cllr. David Howes

Councillors
Kettering Borough Council Elections 2007
Alison Wiley (Conservative)
Kettering Borough Council Elections 2011
Alison Wiley (Conservative)
Kettering Borough Council By-Elections 2013
David Howes (Conservative)
Kettering Borough Council Elections 2015
David Howes (Conservative)

Current Ward Boundaries (2007-)

Kettering Borough Council Elections 2007
Note: due to boundary changes, vote changes listed below are based on notional results.

Previous ward boundaries (1999-2007)

Kettering Borough Council Elections 2003

(Vote count shown is ward average)

See also
Kettering
Kettering Borough Council

Electoral wards in Kettering